Eysteinn Þórðarson (3 March 1934 – 24 December 2009) was an Icelandic alpine skier. He competed at the 1956 Winter Olympics and the 1960 Winter Olympics.

References

1934 births
2009 deaths
Eysteinn Thórdarson
Eysteinn Thórdarson
Alpine skiers at the 1956 Winter Olympics
Alpine skiers at the 1960 Winter Olympics
20th-century Icelandic people